Checketts is a surname. Notable people with the surname include:

Andrew Checketts (born 1975), American college baseball coach and former player
Dave Checketts (born 1956), American businessman
David Checketts (born 1930), former Private Secretary to the Prince of Wales
Johnny Checketts (1912–2006), New Zealand flying ace